Werner Pfeil (born 19 December 1937) is a German athlete. He competed in the men's high jump at the 1960 Summer Olympics.

References

External links
 

1937 births
Living people
People from Jüterbog
People from the Province of Brandenburg
German male high jumpers
Sportspeople from Brandenburg
Olympic athletes of the United Team of Germany
Athletes (track and field) at the 1960 Summer Olympics